The Sankuru River is a major river in the Democratic Republic of the Congo. Its approximate length of 1,200 km makes it the longest tributary of the Kasai River.

Above the confluence with its tributary Mbuji-Mayi it is also known as Lubilash. It flows northwards and then westwards crossing through a few towns, most notably Lusambo.

References

 
Rivers of the Democratic Republic of the Congo
Kasai River